Stan Coughtrie was a Scottish international rugby union player, who played for  and the Lions.

He also played for Edinburgh Academicals.

He was on the 1959 British Lions tour to Australia and New Zealand.

References
 Bath, Richard – A Scottish Rugby Miscellany
 McLaren, Bill – Talking of Rugby
 Massie, Allan A Portrait of Scottish Rugby (Polygon, Edinburgh)

Scottish rugby union players
Scotland international rugby union players
British & Irish Lions rugby union players from Scotland
Edinburgh Academicals rugby union players